Lajos Czinege (1924–1998) was a Hungarian military officer and politician, who served as Minister of Defence from 1960 to 1984.

References
 Magyar Életrajzi Lexikon

1924 births
1998 deaths
People from Karcag
Members of the Hungarian Working People's Party
Members of the Hungarian Socialist Workers' Party
Hungarian soldiers
Defence ministers of Hungary